James Fisher may refer to:

Politics
James Fisher (physician) (died 1822), Scottish-born physician and politician in Lower Canada
James Hurtle Fisher (1790–1875),  South Australian lawyer, first mayor of Adelaide
James Fisher (Wisconsin politician) (1816–1901), Wisconsin State Senator, United States
James Temple Fisher (1828–1905), New Zealand politician
James Fisher (Manitoba politician) (1840–1927), politician in Manitoba, Canada
James Bickerton Fisher (1843–1910), New Zealand politician

Others
James Fisher (Secession minister) (1697–1775), a founder of the Scottish secession church
J. C. Fisher (James Churchill Fisher, 1826–1891), Australian composer, singing teacher
James Fisher (footballer) (1876–?), Scottish footballer
James Fisher (naturalist) (1912–1970), British author and naturalist
James L. Fisher (1931–2022), American university administrator
James Fisher (actor) (born 1972), British actor
J. Richard Fisher (James Richard Fisher, born 1943), scientist at the National Radio Astronomy Observatory

See also 
James Fisher Robinson (1800–1882), governor of Kentucky
James Fisher Trotter (1802–1866), U.S. senator
James Fisher-Harris (born 1996), New Zealand rugby player
James Fischer (1927–2004), American engineer
James Fisher & Sons, UK marine services company
Robert James Fischer (1943–2008), American chess player better known as Bobby Fischer